Sylacauga Municipal Airport , also known as Merkel Field, is a city-owned public-use airport located three nautical miles (3.5 mi, 5.6 km) west of the central business district of Sylacauga, a city in Talladega County, Alabama, United States. It is included in the FAA's National Plan of Integrated Airport Systems for 2011–2015, which categorized it as a general aviation facility.

Although most U.S. airports use the same three-letter location identifier for the FAA and IATA, this airport is assigned SCD by the FAA but has no designation from the IATA (which assigned SCD to Sulaco, Honduras).

Facilities and aircraft 
It has one runway designated 9/27 with an asphalt surface measuring 5,390 by 100 feet (1,643 x 30 m).

For the 12-month period ending December 15, 2010, the airport had 28,316 aircraft operations, an average of 77 per day: 99% general aviation and 1% military. At that time there were 63 aircraft based at this airport: 79% single-engine, 9% multi-engine, 5% helicopter, 5% glider and 2% ultralight.

References

External links 
 

Airports in Alabama
Transportation buildings and structures in Talladega County, Alabama